Samuel B. Wilson (born Samuel Wilson) (March 17, 1783 – August 1, 1869) was a Virginia theologian and professor. He served a brief period as acting President of Hampden–Sydney College in 1847.

Biography
Wilson was the born in Crowders, North Carolina in 1783, the tenth child to John and Mary Wray Wilson. He was christened as Samuel Wilson, but as a young man he added a middle name and subsequently signed himself as Samuel B. Wilson. Dr. Wilson later told his grandson, William Caruthers (son of William Alexander Caruthers and great-nephew of Archibald Alexander, the B. stood for Brown, in memory of Rev. Samuel Brown, in whose family Dr. Wilson lived for some time while studying theology under him.

Wilson was a professor at the Union Theological Seminary now (Union Presbyterian Seminary) in Hampden Sydney, Virginia from November 1841 to August 1869. In 1847, Wilson accepted the role as Acting President of Hampden–Sydney College, a position he held for three months before being replaced by F. S. Sampson.

References

1783 births
1869 deaths
Presidents of Hampden–Sydney College
Presbyterian Church in the United States of America ministers
People from Gaston County, North Carolina